Little Mister Jim is a 1946 American drama film directed by Fred Zinnemann and starring Butch Jenkins, James Craig and Frances Gifford.

Plot

Army captain "Big Jim" Tukker has a young son, Little Jim, who runs away from home. Once found, the unhappy boy is cheered by the news that he will soon be getting a new baby brother or sister. But when his mother dies in childbirth, his father takes to drinking, neglecting him.

Others intervene on the boy's behalf, including Sui Jen, the family servant. Efforts to shake Big Jim out of his depression fail until Sui Jen begins teaching the child Chinese philosophy and faith, going so far as to dress him in Chinese apparel. The boy's father realizes he must take a more personal interest in parenting, then discovers, to his astonishment, that Sui Jen is actually an officer in the Chinese army.

Cast
 James Craig as Capt. Tukker
 Butch Jenkins as Little Jim
 Frances Gifford as Jean
 Laura La Plante as Mrs. Glenson
 Spring Byington as Mrs. Starwell
 Morris Ankrum as Mr. Starwell
 Chingwah Lee as Sui Jen
 Celia Travers as Miss Martin
 Luana Patten as Missey

Production
Parts of the film were shot in Fort Douglas, Utah.

Reception
According to MGM records the film was not a hit, earning $533,000 in the US and Canada and $254,000 elsewhere, making a loss to the studio of $640,000.

References

External links

Little Mister Jim at TCMDB

1946 films
1946 drama films
Metro-Goldwyn-Mayer films
American drama films
Films shot in Utah
American black-and-white films
1940s English-language films
1940s American films
Films directed by Fred Zinnemann